Major-General Hubert Ion Wetherall Hamilton,  (27 June 1861 – 14 October 1914) was a senior British Army officer who served with distinction throughout his career, seeing battle in the Mahdist War in Egypt and the Second Boer War in South Africa, before being given command of the 3rd Division at the outbreak of the First World War. Just two and a half months later, at the height of the Race for the Sea, Hamilton was killed by artillery fire while surveying the front line, the first British divisional commander to be killed in action during the conflict. He had received several honours for his service and was popular amongst his men, who nicknamed him "Hammy" and expressed sorrow at his death; each regiment in his division despatched representatives to his funeral, despite being involved in heavy fighting less than a mile away.

Early life
Born on 27 June 1861, Hubert Ion Wetherall Hamilton was the son of General Henry Meade Hamilton, and one of four brothers to enter military service, including General Sir Bruce Meade Hamilton. As children the Hamilton brothers were surrounded by military figures; in addition to their father, their brother-in-law was Major General Sir George Pomeroy Colley, who was killed in action at the battle of Majuba Hill in 1881. Hamilton was educated at Haileybury and Imperial Service College and, following attendance at the Royal Military College, entered service with the 2nd Foot Regiment (Queen's Royal Regiment) in 1880.

Military career
In the early 1880s Hamilton travelled to India with his regiment, and there was involved in the Burma Expedition from 1886 to 1888, remaining in the country as Adjutant from 1886 to 1890 and winning the campaign medal with two clasps. He was promoted to captain in December 1890. By 1896 he was back in England, and was appointed an aide-de-camp to Major-General Thomas Kelly-Kenny, commanding an Infantry brigade at Aldershot Garrison.

In the following year, Hamilton was involved in the Mahdist War, when he accompanied Sir Herbert Kitchener's army against the Mahdist forces, fighting at the battle of Atbara, the battle of Omdurman and, in November 1899 as Deputy Adjutant general, in the final advance against the Khalifa during the Battle of Umm Diwaykarat. He was Mentioned in Despatches (5 September 1898) and rewarded for his service with the Distinguished Service Order and the Imperial Ottoman Order (Fourth Class) from the Khedive of Egypt.

In late 1899 Hamilton left Egypt and was immediately engaged in another war, against the Boers in South Africa, where he was again appointed aide-de-camp to Major-General Kelly-Kenny, by now commander of the 6th Division. From January 1900 he was a staff officer with the role of Deputy Assistant Adjutant-General, and performed so well in this position that he was advanced to Assistant Adjutant-General in July 1900 and recommended to Lord Kitchener as a personal aide-de-camp and Military Secretary from November 1900. He was engaged in operations in the Orange Free State, Transvaal and Cape Colony and also saw action at the battle of Paardeberg, for which he was Mentioned in Despatches three times (31 March 1900, 16 April 1901, 29 July 1902) and awarded the Queen's South Africa Medal with four clasps and King's South Africa Medal with two clasps. For his field service, he was appointed aide-de-camp to the King, and given a brevet promotion to colonel. With the war's successful conclusion, Hamilton returned home in June 1902, carrying the peace despatches from Lord Kitchener to the government and the King, who received him at Windsor Castle. Less than six months later, Hamilton accompanied Kitchener to India, again as his Military Secretary, and received the substantive rank of colonel on 28 November 1902. In 1906 he left Kitchener's service to assume command of the 7th Brigade and was made a Companion of the Order of the Bath. In 1908 Hamilton left 7th Brigade for a promotion to major general and an appointment as Chief of General Staff in the Mediterranean. In 1909 he was made a Commander of the Royal Victorian Order. His last peacetime appointment was in England, commanding the North Midland Division of the Territorial Force from 1911.

First World War
Hamilton received command of the 3rd Division in June 1914, and at the outbreak of the First World War immediately took the force to France with the British Expeditionary Force in the II Corps under General Horace Smith-Dorrien. During August and September, Hamilton's force was almost continuously engaged, fighting at the battle of Mons, Le Cateau and along the lines of the Marne River. In exhausting combat, casualties were massive and Hamilton came close to death on 26 September when a shell landed just feet away from where he and two other generals were discussing operations. Luckily for them however, the munition did not detonate. In spite of difficult conditions of the campaign, Hamilton shared his men's hardships and was frequently in the front line, earning the affectionate nickname "Hammy" from his subordinates.

Hamilton's luck did not last. As British, French and German units raced for the Picardy coast during the Race for the Sea, Hamilton's division was in the vanguard and was heavily engaged in the opening weeks of October. On 14 October, Hamilton and several aides-de-camp traveled to the village of La Couture near Béthune on the front lines to witness the situation and had just dismounted from their horses when a large shrapnel shell detonated yards overhead. The officers who accompanied him were unhurt but a single bullet entered General Hamilton's forehead, killing him instantly. An aide of General Hamilton, William Congreve, wrote in his diary: "14 October, La Couture, Hammy is dead, and we lose a splendid soldier and I a very good friend."

Hamilton was buried in the churchyard at La Couture, against the church wall with General Smith-Dorrien in attendance and a representative of each regiment in the division as an honour guard. The only light was provided by car headlamps, and shellfire occasionally forced the chaplain to pause in the service. Indeed, fighting was so close during the brief ceremony that enemy bullets occasionally struck the walls and nearby graves, although none of the mourners were hit. General Smith-Dorrien concluded the service with the words "Indeed a true soldier's grave. God rest his soul."

Legacy
Once the fighting had moved on, Hamilton's body was exhumed and returned to England, before being reburied at St Martin's Church in Cheriton. His gravestone quotes a verse from Australian poet Adam Lindsay Gordon. A memorial tablet bearing his portrait in profile was placed inside the same church.

A large plaque was also dedicated to him anonymously in St Peter's Church at Marchington, Staffordshire (where he lived before the war) stating "I have fought the good fight. I have finished my course. I have kept faith". Years after his death his collected papers, mainly pertaining to the Second Boer War, were donated to the Liddell Hart Centre for Military Archives at King's College London, where they are still available.

References

Bibliography

External links
 
 
 
 
 

|-

1861 births
1914 deaths
Burials in Kent
British Army major generals
British Army generals of World War I
British military personnel killed in World War I
British military personnel of the Third Anglo-Burmese War
British Army personnel of the Mahdist War
British Army personnel of the Second Boer War
Companions of the Distinguished Service Order
Commanders of the Royal Victorian Order
Companions of the Order of the Bath
Graduates of the Royal Military College, Sandhurst
People educated at Haileybury and Imperial Service College
Queen's Royal Regiment officers
People from the Borough of East Staffordshire